Daud Khan may refer to:

 David XI of Kartli (died 1579), aka Daud Khan of Kartli, Muslim Georgian king
 Daud Ali Khan (died 1883), nawab of Masulipatam in India
 Daud Khan (cricketer) (1912–1979), cricket player and umpire 
 Daud Khan Karrani (reigned 1572–76), Bengali ruler who fought the armies of Akbar the Great
 Daud Khan Panni, nawab of Carnatic
 Daud Khan Undiladze, 17th-century Georgian official in the Iranian service
 Mohammed Daoud Khan (1909–1978), president of the Republic of Afghanistan